The Monaghan Senior Hurling Championship is an annual hurling competition contested by top-tier Monaghan GAA clubs. The Monaghan County Board of the Gaelic Athletic Association has organised it since 1909.

Castleblayney Hurling Club are the title holders (2022) defeating Carrickmacross in the Final.

Honours

The trophy presented to the winners was the Blayney Shoe Company Cup (1945-1996) and now the Mick Quigley Cup (since 1997). The winners of the Monaghan Championship qualify to represent their county in the Ulster Intermediate Club Hurling Championship or Ulster Junior Club Hurling Championship. The winners can, in turn, go on to play in the All-Ireland Intermediate Club Hurling Championship or All-Ireland Junior Club Hurling Championship.

The Mick Hannon DHL (Development Hurling League) is the Monaghan reserve hurling league. It was renamed in 2020, with Inniskeen being the first team to win the Mick Hannon Cup in 2021, defeating Carrickmacross in the final on a scoreline of 3-07 to 1-07.

List of finals
(r) = replay

References

External links
Official Monaghan Website
Monaghan on Hoganstand
Monaghan Club GAA

Monaghan GAA club championships
Senior hurling county championships
Hurling competitions in Ulster